Marcelo Tavares (born August 30, 1980) is a Brazilian football (soccer) defender who is playing for Al-Sailiya in Qatar.

References

Brazilian footballers
Living people
1980 births
Avaí FC players
Sociedade Esportiva Palmeiras players
Associação Portuguesa de Desportos players
Al Hilal SFC players
Al-Shabab FC (Riyadh) players
Cruzeiro Esporte Clube players
Al-Rayyan SC players
Al-Sailiya SC players
Lekhwiya SC players
Saudi Professional League players
Qatar Stars League players
Association football defenders
People from Santa Rosa de Viterbo, São Paulo